Volchek is a surname. Notable people with the surname include:

 Galina Volchek (1933–2019), Soviet and Russian theater and film director, actress, and teacher
 Nataliya Volchek (born 1972), Belarusian rower

See also
 Volchok